Shan Yilin is a Chinese paralympic biathlete who competed at the 2022 Winter Paralympics.

Career
Yilin participated at the 2022 Winter Paralympics in the biathlon competition, and won the silver medal in the women's 6 kilometres and the bronze medal in the women's 12.5 kilometres event. She also won a silver medal in the 4 × 2.5 kilometre mixed relay cross-country skiing event.

References

External links 
Paralympic Games profile

Living people
Place of birth missing (living people)
Year of birth missing (living people)
Biathletes at the 2022 Winter Paralympics
Medalists at the 2022 Winter Paralympics
Paralympic silver medalists for China
Paralympic bronze medalists for China
Paralympic medalists in biathlon
Paralympic medalists in cross-country skiing
21st-century Chinese people